Eera Vizhi Kaaviyangal is a 1982 Indian Tamil-language film directed by B. R. Ravi Shankar, starring Sarath Babu, Pratap Pothen and Raadhika. It was released on 4 June 1982.

Plot

Cast 
Sarath Babu
Pratap Pothen
Raadhika

Soundtrack 
The music for this film was composed by Ilaiyaraaja.

References

External links 
 

1980s Tamil-language films
1982 films
Films scored by Ilaiyaraaja